Elections to Metropolitan Borough of Bermondsey were held in 1956.

The borough had 13 wards which returned between 3 and 5 members. Of the 13 wards 6 of the wards had all candidates elected unopposed. Labour won all the seats, the Conservatives only stood in 4 wards, the Liberal Party 1 ward and the Communist Party 1 ward.

Election result

|}

References

Council elections in the London Borough of Southwark
1956 in London
1956 English local elections
Bermondsey